The Street (stylized as The $treet) is an American drama television series that aired on Fox from November 1 to December 13, 2000. Created by Jeff Rake and Darren Star, only 12 episodes were produced, and the series was pulled from U.S. airwaves after seven episodes aired. The entire show aired overseas.

Premise
The series was about a small brokerage house called Belmont Stevens located in New York City and the lives of its employees.

Cast
Tom Everett Scott as Jack Kenderson
Melissa De Sousa as Donna Pasqua
Sean Maher as Chris McConnell
Christian Campbell as Tim Sherman
Nina Garbiras as Alexandra "Alex" Brill
Giancarlo Esposito as Tom Divack 
Rick Hoffman as Freddie Sacker
Jennifer Connelly as Catherine Miller
Bridgette Wilson as Bridgette Dishell
Adam Goldberg as Evan Mitchell

Episodes

Reception
Dalton Ross of Entertainment Weekly gave the series premiere a grade of D+, stating that the "Darren Star created drama plays like a bad Melrose Place episode with obligatory IPO terminology thrown in". Howard Rosenberg of Los Angeles Times was lukewarm on the show, calling it "passable but hardly a highlight".

References

External links
 SeanMaher.info: The $treet
 

2000s American drama television series
2000 American television series debuts
2000 American television series endings
Fox Broadcasting Company original programming
Television series by Sony Pictures Television
Television shows set in New York City
English-language television shows
Television series created by Darren Star